Orthos is a genus of skippers in the family Hesperiidae.

Species
Recognised species in the genus Orthos include:
 Orthos orthos (Godman, [1900])

Former species
Orthos gabina (Godman, 1900) - transferred to Neoxeniades gabina (Godman, 1900)
Orthos lycortas (Godman, 1900) - transferred to Corta lycortas (Godman, 1900)
Orthos trinka Evans, 1955 - transferred to Oxynthes trinka (Evans, 1955)

References

Natural History Museum Lepidoptera genus database

Hesperiini
Hesperiidae genera